Caleb Rudow is an American politician serving as a member of the North Carolina House of Representatives from the 116th district. He was appointed on February 1, 2022, succeeding Susan Fisher.

Early life and education 
A native of Asheville, North Carolina, Rudow graduated from Asheville High School in 2005. He earned a Bachelor of Arts degree in philosophy from the University of North Carolina at Chapel Hill and a Master of Arts in global policy studies from the University of Texas at Austin.

Career 
From 2008 to 2011, Rudow worked as a manager at a gardening company. From 2012 to 2014, he served as a Peace Corps volunteer in Zambia. He continued his work in Zambia as a member of the United States Agency for International Development (USAID) Zambia Economic Development Team until 2015. In 2018, he worked as a consultant with the World Bank Group. He was also a research fellow at the Center for Open Data Enterprise in Washington, D.C. In 2019 and 2020, he was a regional organizing coordinator for Swing Left. From August to October 2020, he was a census enumerator for the United States Census Bureau. Rudow joined Open Data Watch in 2018 and has since worked as a program assistant and data analyst until leaving the organization in July 2021. In 2021, he worked as a COVID-19 case investigator for Community Care of North Carolina. He was appointed to the North Carolina House of Representatives in February 2022.

Electoral history

2022

References

|-

Living people
People from Asheville, North Carolina
University of North Carolina at Chapel Hill alumni
University of Texas at Austin alumni
Democratic Party members of the North Carolina House of Representatives
Peace Corps volunteers
Year of birth missing (living people)
21st-century American politicians